The 2011-2012 Elitserien was the fifth season of the Swedish bandy league Elitserien.

League table
The regular season started 25 October 2011 and ended 21 February 2012.

Standings as of 12 December 2011

Teams 1–8 qualifies to the playoffs, teams 9–10 qualifies to next season's Elitserien, teams 11–12 plays the second placed teams of each Allsvenskan to qualify to next season and teams 13–14 are relegated to Allsvenskan

Knock-out stage
The playoff starts 26 February and ends with the final 25 March 2012.

Final

Season statistics

Top scorers

References

Elitserien (bandy) seasons
Bandy
Bandy
Elitserien
Elitserien